The New Pupil is a 1940 Our Gang short comedy film directed by Edward Cahn. It was the 190th Our Gang short that was released.

Plot
Sally (Juanita Quigley) is a new student at the school that the gang goes to. Upon Sally's arrival, Alfalfa and Spanky literally fall over each other trying to get her attention, leaving the gang's traditional sweetheart Darla in the lurch. But when it turns out that Sally cannot stand either one of the boys, she and Darla cook up a scheme to dampen their romantic aspirations.

Notes and reception
This film was released before Bubbling Troubles but produced after.
The New Pupil marked the debut of Billy Laughlin who would play the character "Froggy".
This marked the final appearance of Harold "Slim" Switzer. At 14 years of age, he was the oldest member of the cast.

Cast

The Gang
 Darla Hood as Darla Hood
 George McFarland as Spanky
 Carl Switzer as Alfalfa
 Billie Thomas as Buckwheat
 Robert Blake as Mickey (appearing under his birth name, Mickey Gubitosi)

Additional cast
 Juanita Quigley as Sally Stevens
 Billy Laughlin as Harold
 Patsy Currier as Darla's friend
 May McAvoy as Sally's mother
 Anne O'Neal as Teacher
 Joe "Corky" Geil as Classroom extra
 Giovanna Gubitosi as Classroom extra
 Paul Hilton as Classroom extra
 Darwood Kaye as Classroom extra
 Tommy McFarland as Classroom extra
 Harold Switzer as Classroom extra

See also
 Our Gang filmography

References

External links

1940 films
American black-and-white films
1940 comedy films
Films directed by Edward L. Cahn
Metro-Goldwyn-Mayer short films
Our Gang films
1940 short films
1940s American films
1940s English-language films